Sylvester House is a historic house built c. 1870 in the Bayview–Hunters Point neighborhood of San Francisco, California. 

The Sylvester House has been listed as a San Francisco Designated Landmark since April 5, 1974.

History 
The two-story house, located at located at 1556 Revere Avenue, San Francisco, was built between 1865 and 1870, by local carpenter Stephen L. Piper. It was designed in the Italianate style, with a symmetrical, flat front façade and features a full width front porch. The Sylvester House was originally located on Quesada Avenue (then called Sumatra Street), and it was moved in 1913 to its present location on Revere Avenue. When this home was built, the surrounding area was rural land, and it was considered part of South San Francisco.

The home was built for Maria (née) Donnelly and Daniel Sylvester (a native of Hesse, Germany), and the Sylvester family's eight children. It was occupied from 1884 to 1900 by their children, Daniel and John Sylvester, who were wholesale meat butchers and cattle dealers in what was then known as Butchertown (now Bayview–Hunters Point).

See also 
 List of San Francisco Designated Landmarks

References 

San Francisco Designated Landmarks
Houses completed in 1870
1870s architecture in the United States
Bayview–Hunters Point, San Francisco